Matthias Buse (born 3 March 1959) is an East German former ski jumper who competed from 1977 to 1984. He won the individual normal hill event at the 1978 FIS Nordic World Ski Championships in Lahti, then won a silver medal in the team large hill at the 1984 FIS Nordic World Ski Championships in Engelberg.

Buse also won an individual normal hill event at Oberstdorf in 1977. Today he is the vice-president of VSC Klingenthal

References

External links

German male ski jumpers
1959 births
Living people
People from Zittau
Olympic ski jumpers of East Germany
Ski jumpers at the 1984 Winter Olympics
FIS Nordic World Ski Championships medalists in ski jumping
Sportspeople from Saxony